Scary Movie 5 (stylized on-screen as Scary MoVie) is a 2013 American comedy horror film. It is the standalone sequel to Scary Movie 4 and the fifth and final installment in the Scary Movie film series. It is the second film to be distributed by The Weinstein Company under the Dimension Films brand, and the last before it folded in 2018. The film is directed by Malcolm D. Lee and written by David Zucker and Pat Proft. It was released on April 12, 2013.
The film is the only installment of the franchise not to feature Cindy Campbell (played by Anna Faris) or Brenda Meeks (Regina Hall). It premiered on April 11, at the Hollywood’s ArcLight Cinerama Dome. The film parodies various horror films and other popular culture. The film received negative reviews from critics. With a gross of $78 million, it is the lowest grossing film in the Scary Movie series.

Plot 
Charlie Sheen and Lindsay Lohan get together to make a sex tape with over 20 cameras beside Sheen's bed. The time-lapsed tape fast forwards through the two doing all sorts of bedroom antics, including gymnastics, riding a horse, and having clowns jump in under the sheets. Sheen is pulled into the air by a paranormal force and thrown against walls, shelves, and doors until he lands on the bed again. Lohan is frightened so she decides to go home when she flies into the air as well; she becomes possessed and throws Sheen into the camera and kills him. The text explains that Sheen's body was found that day but he didn't stop partying until days later and that his three children were found missing, Lohan was arrested, again, and a reward was put out for the missing kids.

Several months later, Ja'Marcus and D'Andre are walking in the Humboldt County woods in California in search of cannabis plants to steal. After stealing one and fleeing, they take shelter in a cabin in the woods. Upon entering they see three strange creatures, later confirmed to be Sheen's children, and turn them in for the reward. The feral children are placed in isolation at a child development research center for a few months until they are deemed well enough to be returned to familial custody. When Sheen's brother, Dan Sanders and his wife Jody come to collect them, they are told they can have them if they agree to stay in a large suburban middle-class home fitted with security cameras. Jody is reluctant to take the kids at first but soon adjusts to having them. In an attempt to bond with their new children, Jody takes an auditions for a ballet performance, Swan Lake, and is cast in the lead role as the Swan Queen.

Meanwhile, a continuing pattern of bizarre paranormal activity in their new home makes them investigate further. They eventually learn from the children that the attacks on their home are by "Mama", the mother of the children, who is under a curse and is trying to get them back so she can sacrifice both herself and the children. Maria, the couple's Hispanic live-in maid and housekeeper, is frightened and keeps experimenting with various rituals, Catholic and otherwise, to ward off the evil spirits in the house.  During the day, Dan is frustrated with the modest progress of his test subjects at a primate intelligence research facility; ironically, Dan is not bright enough to realize that one of the chimpanzees, Caesar, is now actually much smarter than he is. One night, the pool drain invites others to a party. In the morning, Maria sees the mess in the pool and does more rituals, causing Dan to fire her. Because Dan doesn't understand her Spanish, they start a fight that leads to the lab that cause all the apes to be released.

Jody and Dan, with the help of Jody's close friend Kendra Brooks, who Jody met at her ballet class, must quickly find a way to lift the curse and save their family. Along the way, they seek the assistance of psychic Blaine Fulda, who turns out to be a complete fraud, and a dream extractor named Dom Kolb, who helps them understand that the solution to their problems lies in the mysterious Book of the Evil. However, Jody and Kendra fail to see what the book is capable of, oblivious to four friends continuously becoming possessed and reviving in the cabin. They wreak havoc when either of the two read the two passages of the book; one that unleashes demons, "gort klaatu barada nikto", and the other that revives them from possession. When "Mama" takes the children to a cliff to sacrifice them, Jody fails to lift the curse with the book, but does manage to knock the evil spirit into Ja'Marcus and D'Andre's pool containing a live shark, which then devours her.

Realizing the love for her adopted children is all she needs in life, Jody gives the part of the Swan Queen to Kendra, who performs the dance in the style of a stripper. The performance is heavily applauded by an audience that includes Jody, Dan, the children, Kendra's family, and Madea. The story's narrator is revealed to be Caesar, who then informs the audience that the humans should enjoy the time they have on Earth and says that apes will one day to take over the world.

In a post-credits scene, Sheen wakes up, with Dom Kolb sitting beside him, from a dream extraction, i.e. the whole movie was a dream. After Kolb informs that Sheen will be sleeping with Lohan, a car crashes into the room, killing Sheen. Lohan is revealed as the driver; she gets out of the car, says to Kolb, "You were driving," and throws him the keys, blaming the accident on him.

Cast 

 Ashley Tisdale as Jody Sanders
 Simon Rex as Dan Sanders
 Erica Ash as Kendra Brooks
 Gracie Whitton as Kathy
 Ava Kolker as Lily
 Lidia Porto as Maria
 Charlie Sheen as himself
 Lindsay Lohan as herself
 Terry Crews as Martin
 Jasmine Guy as Mrs. Brooks
 Darrell Hammond as Dr. Hall
 Heather Locklear as Barbara 
 J. P. Manoux as Pierre
 Mac Miller as D'Andre
 Sarah Hyland as Mia
 Tyler Posey as David
 Shad "Bow Wow" Moss as Eric
 Katrina Bowden as Natalie
 Jerry O'Connell as Christian Grey
 Molly Shannon as Heather Darcy
 Snoop Dogg as Ja'Marcus
 Mike Tyson as himself
 Usher as Ira the Janitor
 Ben Cornish as Dom Kolb
 Kate Walsh as Mal Colb
 Katt Williams as Blaine Fulda
 Lil Duval as Brooks
 Angie Stone as Kendra's Cousin
 Lewis Thompson as Mabel "Madea" Simmons
 Audrina Patridge and Kendra Wilkinson (deleted scenes) as Christian Grey's slaves
 Big Ang as herself
 Shereé Whitfield as herself
 Josh Robert Thompson as Narrator (voice)/ Caesar (voice)
Christopher Antonucci as Caesar

Parodies 
The main films parodied in Scary Movie 5 include Paranormal Activity, Black Swan, Mama and Rise of the Planet of the Apes. Other films parodied are Sinister, Inception,  Ted (only in the unrated DVD), Evil Dead (which was released a week prior to the film), The Cabin in the Woods, Insidious and The Help. The film also parodies the best-selling novel Fifty Shades of Grey and Tyler Perry's character Madea.

Production 

The film is directed by Malcolm D. Lee and written by David Zucker. Anna Faris, who starred in the previous films in the franchise, confirmed that she would not return for the fifth film. Tisdale's involvement in the film was confirmed in June 2012.

Lohan and Sheen joined the cast in August 2012. Terry Crews joined the cast on August 14, 2012.

Filming began in September 2012. The first promotional image of the film, featuring Lohan and Sheen in the very first scene of the movie, was released on September 20, 2012.

The only actors from any of the previous installments to appear in this film are Sheen, Rex, Shannon, and Hammond. They do not portray their original characters, Sheen stars as himself, Rex plays Dan, Shannon plays Heather, and Hammond plays a doctor.

The film was largely shot in and around Atlanta, Georgia in the fall of 2012, with additional filming January and February 2013 at Sunset Gower Studios in Los Angeles. David Zucker reportedly handled additional filming and reshoots while Malcolm D. Lee was starting production for The Best Man Holiday.

Music 

Scary Movie 5: Original Motion Picture Soundtrack is the soundtrack of the film and was released on April 23, 2013.

Scary Movie 5: Original Motion Picture Score is the soundtrack of the film scored by James L. Venable it was released on May 14, 2013. All songs were written and composed by Venable.

Release

Home media 
Scary Movie 5 was released on DVD and Blu-ray on August 20, 2013. An unrated version was also released.

Reception

Box office 
Scary Movie 5 grossed $32 million in North America and $46.4 million in other countries, for a worldwide total of $78.4 million. In North America, the film opened to #2 in its first weekend with $14.2 million, behind 42, making it the lowest-grossing opening weekend for a film in the Scary Movie franchise.

It was expected to take in about half as much as its predecessors, around $17 million in its opening weekend. The film held up reasonably well in its second weekend, slipping two spots to #4 with an estimated $6,296,000. In its third weekend, the film dipped 43.8% to #7 earning an estimated $3,457,000. The film held a spot in the top ten for the fourth weekend in a row, falling to #9 with a gross of $1,441,360. Scary Movie 5 fell to #13 in its fifth weekend earning $675,942 and slid to #15 in its sixth with $420,253.

Critical response 
Scary Movie 5 was not screened for critics in advance. The film was panned by critics. On Rotten Tomatoes, the film has a score of 4% based on 52 reviews and an average rating of 2.29 out of 10. The site's consensus states: "Juvenile even by Scary Movie standards, this fifth installment offers stale pop culture gags that generate few laughs." On Metacritic, the film has a score of 11 out of 100 based on 16 reviews, indicating "overwhelming dislike". Audiences surveyed by CinemaScore gave the film a grade "C−" on a scale of A+ to F.

IGN gave the film a 1.0 out of 10. Stephanie Merry of The Washington Post gave the film zero stars saying, "The movie is so appalling that even a film fan who guffawed her way through The Aristocrats would feel nothing but a deep emptiness as the end credits begin to roll, wondering if one solid joke was too much to ask from a movie that bills itself as comedy." Kyle Smith of the New York Post gave the film one star saying, "Down at the bottom of the comedy barrel, where the slimy gray algae-like stuff lives: That’s where this script came from. If you must go to see Scary Movie 5, be sure to bring an iPad with you. That way you can watch a better movie on it."

Joe Neumaier of The New York Daily News gave the film one star saying, "Like so much of this whole series – hatched in 2000 by the Wayans brothers and intermittently directed by Airplane! veteran David Zucker, though newcomer Malcolm D. Lee takes over here – the mere mention of a familiar pop culture figure or title is supposed to be hilarious. It often isn't, and in fact the constant name-dropping and gross-out humor gets tiresome (in a movie that's at least 10 minutes too long). Luckily, folks like Snoop and good sports like Sheen and, yes, Lohan, break up the monotony. Until, like an undead beastie, the boredom and dumb jokes come roaring back."

Rafer Guzman of Newsday felt that "Even the talented people – comedian Katt Williams as a fake psychic, high-energy actor Jerry O'Connell in a send-up of the 'Fifty Shades of Grey' books – get chewed up and spit out by this relentless anti-laugh machine. Scary Movie 5 doesn't even have the imagination for a worthwhile gross-out joke. When the best you can offer is a poopy toothbrush, it's time to pack it in." Darren Franich of Entertainment Weekly said "Hitting theaters seven years after the last Scary Movie, the new film doesn't even feature the ameliorating presence of Anna Faris, who gave the earlier films a certain spoofy grace. In her place is High School Musical refugee Ashley Tisdale, her face frozen in an eye roll of mild irritation. Who can blame her? The film hopscotches between too-late riffs on Rise of the Planet of the Apes, Inception, Insidious, and Black Swan. At a running time of 86 minutes, it's about as long as an episode of Saturday Night Live, except with less laughs and worse storytelling." Frank Scheck of The Hollywood Reporter said "The filmmakers’ desperation is evident from the fact that a good chunk of the running time is devoted to spoofing the recent Jessica Chastain starrer Mama. While that film was indeed a sleeper hit, it hardly seems memorable enough to warrant such sustained treatment, and indeed the comic payoffs are nil."

The film has earned three nominations at the 34th Golden Raspberry Awards including Worst Supporting Actress for Lindsay Lohan, Worst Screen Combo for Lohan and Charlie Sheen and Worst Prequel, Remake, Ripoff or Sequel.

Director Malcolm D. Lee was very critical of the movie: "It was just a bad movie. Believe me. Don’t bother going to see that movie. Or renting it, or anything. It’s not worth your time”.

See also 
 American films of 2013
 List of comedy films of the 2010s
 List of ghost films
 List of horror films of the 2010s
 Parody film

References

External links 

 
 
 

Scary Movie (film series)
2013 films
2013 comedy horror films
2010s American films
2010s English-language films
2010s parody films
2010s supernatural horror films
American comedy horror films
American parody films
American sequel films
American supernatural comedy films
American supernatural horror films
Dimension Films films
Films directed by Malcolm D. Lee
Films scored by James L. Venable
Films shot in Atlanta
Films shot in Los Angeles
Films with screenplays by David Zucker (filmmaker)
Films with screenplays by Pat Proft
Parodies of horror
The Weinstein Company films